Elias Granath (born September 6, 1985, in Borlänge, Sweden) is a professional Swedish ice hockey defenceman currently an unrestricted free agent. He played two seasons for Schwenninger Wild Wings of the Deutsche Eishockey Liga (DEL). On December 12, 2015 he signed at new contract with Herning Bluefox of the Danish Metalligaen for the rest of the 2015-2016 season.  He has previously captained Timrå IK in the Swedish Elitserien.

Career statistics

Regular season and playoffs

International

References

External links 

1985 births
Living people
Swedish ice hockey defencemen
Leksands IF players
Dallas Stars draft picks
Djurgårdens IF Hockey players
Schwenninger Wild Wings players
Timrå IK players
People from Borlänge Municipality
Sportspeople from Dalarna County